Patrik Johansson (born 13 September 1988) is a Swedish Bandy player who currently plays for Vetlanda BK as a forward.  Patrick was a youth product of IFK Kungälv.  Patrick has played three times for the Swedish U17 squad in the 2004/05 season.

Patrick has played for two clubs-
 IFK Kungälv
 Nässjö IF (2005-2006)
 Vetlanda BK (2006-)

External links

Swedish bandy players
Living people
1988 births
Nässjö IF players
Vetlanda BK players
IFK Vänersborg players
IFK Kungälv players
IK Sirius players